Roland Leroux is a German manager and a leading representative of professional organisations on both, the national and the European Level.

He served as president of FECCIA (European Federation on Managerial Staff in the Chemical and Allied Industries) from 2012 to 2022.

On 10 May 2022, he was the first to be appointed Honorary President of FECCIA due to his exceptional merits. 

From 2014 to 2021, he also served as the president of ULA - United Leaders Association, the German confederation of managerial organisations.

Furthermore, he was a member of the Federal Executive Board  of the organization of executives of the German chemical industry  VAA from 2011 to 2021. 

Leroux graduated in Chemistry with a diploma in 1984. In 1986, he received a Ph.D. in Physical Chemistry.

In his professional life, Leroux has headed the division of Industrial and Laboratory Glass of Schott AG for many years as vice-president and he served as head of Corporate Environment, Health, Safety and Security. He also was the Corporate Data Protection Officer.

From 1998 to 2021, he represented the interests of Schott's senior managers as Chairman of the Executive Staff Committee (Sprecherausschuss), a representative body for executive staff.

References 

Living people
Year of birth missing (living people)